St. Matthew Catholic High School is located at 6550 Bilberry Drive in the Orléans district of Ottawa, Ontario, Canada. The current principal is Phillip Capobeanico . The school offers grades 7–12. The current school population rests at about 2000 students with about over 100 staff members.

The school broke the Guinness world record for largest unbroken human chain, called the Bear Hug. The event was in support of Cancer research.

History 

When St. Matthew Catholic High School opened in 1981, it was known as Eastern Area Junior High School, with Grades 6, 7 and 8. Not until June 1982 was the school officially named St. Matthew.

The school opened with about 300 students. In its first year of existence, it was affectionately known by its first principal, Joseph Ryan, as "the far eastern school." It was built by the firm Kearney and Coles with Edward Cuhaci as the architect, on property on Bilberry Drive in Orléans, straddling two sides of Bilberry Creek. The school's first yearbook was entitled, perhaps appropriately, EMANON which is "NO NAME" spelled backwards. It did have an official name, but since it was the wordy "Eastern Area Elementary Junior High School," it was, in a sense, nameless. This all changed at the official opening on 16 June 1982, when it was formally named "St. Matthew Catholic Junior High School.”

The school underwent two expansions over the years to accommodate an ever-growing student population, which peaked at close to 1,800 students. In 1985, the first phase of a two-part expansion took place, adding a number of classrooms. This was followed by the second phase in 1987 that included more classrooms, specialty areas such as an automotive shop, music room, drama room and art room and a second gymnasium/cafeteria. The construction of St. Peter Catholic High School in 1992 provided spaces for some students previously at St. Matthew, relieving some of the enrollment pressures at the school. In 2009/2010, the school underwent another expansion, adding another wing.

Identity 
The school crest, designed by teacher Joe Kelly, is a cross inside an oval, with four symbols, one in each quadrant formed by the cross. The four symbols are a quill representing writing, a book representing reading, a flame representing the spirit of sport and folded hands representing prayer. The name "St. Matthew" is on a banner at the bottom of the crest.

The school mascot is a tiger. All St. Matthew sports teams are called Tigers, symbolizing speed and ferociousness.

Uniform policy 
St. Matthew High School is one of the few in the city of Ottawa that have uniforms.

School layout 
St. Matthew is a medium-sized, two-storey school. The school has two gymnasiums (one used as both a cafeteria and gym), a chapel, and a library. The school also has a satellite building beside the school that consists of 10 classrooms.

Bear Hug

Bear Hug 1 
This event was documented in the 2005 edition of the Guinness Book of World Records. On 23 April 2004, St. Matthew Catholic High School made it into the Guinness Book of World Records with the world's largest bear hug, an endeavour led by school Principal André Potvin, and an achievement which resulted on 9 June 2004 being officially declared "St. Matthew High School Day" by Ottawa Mayor, Bob Chiarelli. The world's largest bear hug involved 5,117 students hugging for ten seconds. This world record was tied in with the school's fundraising for cancer, as students and staff, with the support of local businesses and residents, raised more than $108,000 in April of that year, surpassing the previous provincial record of $40,000 and setting a Canadian record for cancer fundraising by a high school.

Bear Hug 2 
Bear Hug 2 in 2008 unsuccessfully attempted to break the Guinness Record (then held by the citizens of New Mexico at 6,553). Funds were again raised in support of cancer research.

Bear Hug 3 
Bear Hug 3 in May 2010 raised over $500,000 for cancer patient care and research and set a new Guinness World Record of 10,554 participants, which was still standing in 2020.

Sports 
There are 19 teams for high school students and15 teams for grade 7 and 8 students.

The senior boys' basketball team won the Ontario Federation of School Athletic Associations (OFSAA) AAA provincial title in 2009.
The girls' basketball team won the OFSAA AA title in 2014.
The varsity football team won the Metro Bowl (OFSAA) AAA provincial title in 2016.

Annual events  
Every year the grade 8 students go to Boston, Massachusetts as their year end trip. This trip allows students to attend a Broadway show, Martha's Vineyard, Six Flags Amusement Park, whale watching tours, New England Aquarium and various other places in and near Boston.

The school also puts on an annual play. This play varies each year from musicals, to dramas, to action, etc. The play is put on by the drama department and students and is held in the large gym that's walls may be opened up in order to create the stage.

Every year in June, St. Matthew's Grade 12 Graduating Class has their commencement in the larger gym of the 2 that the schools has.

See also 
List of high schools in Ontario

References 

150 years of Catholic Education in Ottawa-Carleton 1856–2006, Ottawa-Carleton Catholic School Board, 2006

External links 

 St. Matthew High's Official Website

 Ottawa Catholic School Board Website

Catholic secondary schools in Ontario
High schools in Ottawa
Educational institutions established in 1981
1981 establishments in Ontario
Middle schools in Ottawa